Coronado is a Spanish surname derived from the village of Cornado, near A Coruña, Galicia.

People with the name
 Francisco Vásquez de Coronado (1510–1554), Spanish explorer often referred to simply as "Coronado"
 Abraham Coronado (born 1992), Mexican footballer
 Carolina Coronado (1820–1911), Spanish author
 Coronado Chávez (1807–1881), President of Honduras
 Evaristo Coronado (born 1960), Costa Rican footballer
 Humberto Aguilar Coronado (born 1963), Mexican politician
 Ingrid Coronado (born 1974), Mexican entertainer
 José Coronado (born 1957), Spanish actor
 Juan Coronado (born 1983), Dominican basketball player
 Luis Coronado (born 1969), Guatemalan weightlifter
 Manuel Martinez Coronado (fl. 1995–1998), Guatemalan farmer and mass murderer
 Marcelina Orta Coronado (born 1968), Mexican politician
 Miguel Coronado (born 1987), Chilean footballer
 Rod Coronado (born 1966), Native American activist
 Sergio Coronado (born 1970), French politician

See also
 Coronado (disambiguation)

References

Spanish-language surnames